The monarchy of Canada forms the core of each Canadian provincial jurisdiction's Westminster-style parliamentary democracy, being the foundation of the executive, legislative, and judicial branches of government in each province. The monarchy has been headed since September 8, 2022 by King Charles III who as sovereign is shared equally with both the Commonwealth realms and the Canadian federal entity. He, his consort, and other members of the Canadian royal family undertake various public and private functions across the country. He is the only member of the royal family with any constitutional role.

Royal Assent and the royal sign-manual are required to enact laws, letters patent, and Orders in Council. The Constitution Act, 1867, leaves the monarch's direct role in the provinces in question and many royal duties in these regions are specifically assigned to the sovereign's provincial viceroys, known as lieutenant governors, who are appointed by the King's federal representative, the governor general. Further, within the conventional stipulations of constitutional monarchy, the Crown's direct participation in any of these areas of governance is limited, with most related powers entrusted for exercise by the elected parliamentarians, the appointed ministers of the Crown generally drawn from amongst them, and the judges and justices of the peace. The Crown today primarily functions as a guarantor of continuous and stable governance and a nonpartisan safeguard against the abuse of power, the sovereign acting as a custodian of the Crown's democratic powers and representing the "power of the people above government and political parties."

In all provinces, the monarchy's roots lie in the British Crown, while in some, mostly in Eastern Canada, the French Crown also had influence. Over the centuries, the institution throughout the country has evolved to become a distinctly Canadian one, represented by unique symbols for each province.

Federal and provincial aspects

The Canadian monarchy is a unitary institution over all eleven of Canada's governmental spheres (one federal and ten provincial); the monarch reigns impartially over the nation as a whole, with the headship of state neither federal nor provincial jurisdiction. At the same time, the one Crown operates separately within each area of governance; it is so central a part of the various governments that any constitutional amendment that affects the monarchy in any or all of them requires the unanimous consent of all the provincial legislatures, along with the federal parliament, rather than the two-thirds majority necessary for most other amendments. There is one monarch, "but she acts in different rights". Such is demonstrated when the sovereign takes on different legal personas in a case wherein a provincial government files a lawsuit against the federal and/or another provincial government. Also, as it was put in Attorney-General of Canada v. Higbie: "When the Crown, in right of the Province, transfers land to the Crown, in right of the Dominion, it parts with no right. What takes place is merely a change of administrative control." The Canadian Crown thus both remains above and links together all of the jurisdictions in Confederation; it has been described as a "divided crown," or a "compound monarchy".

The arrangement provides that each of Canada's provinces are all sovereign of each other and the federal realm. The sovereignty of the provinces is passed on not by the governor general or federal parliament, but through the overreaching Crown itself to the monarch's viceregal representatives in the provinces, the lieutenant governors, and the limitation that they act, in the monarch's name, only on the advice of the relevant provincial ministers of the Crown or legislature. The Supreme Court found in 1918 that provincial legislation cannot bind the federal Crown except "by express terms or necessary intendment", nor can the monarch in his federal council or parliament legislate for the provinces beyond the provisions of the constitution. The provincial Crown "exists to safeguard the independence of each province".

The system was set up as such by the Fathers of Confederation because they saw such a use of constitutional monarchy as a bulwark against any fracturing of the Canadian federation. In 1939, Sir Shuldham Redfern, then Secretary to the Governor General, said that, without a common allegiance to the Crown, the regions of Canada might break up. The British North America Act, 1867 (now the Constitution Act, 1867), was written so as to reflect the view of John A. Macdonald and the Earl of Derby that the provinces were subordinate to the federal Crown, with the lieutenant governors appointed by the governor general and not—as is done with the governors of the Australian states and was suggested be integrated in Canada by the 1979 Task Force on National Unity—by the Queen herself. Further, while the lieutenant governors did each hold a great seal, summoned and prorogued parliament in the Queen's stead, and granted Royal Assent to bills that bore the Queen's name, it was still expected that the latter be given in the name of the governor general.

That rule was never followed in Ontario and Quebec, though, and the other provinces soon followed suit. Then, in 1882, the legitimacy of the lieutenant governors as direct representatives of the monarch was established by the Lord Watson of the Judicial Committee of the Privy Council in the case of Maritime Bank v. Receiver-General of New Brunswick. In his ruling, which discovered a provincial guise of the Crown and thus further empowered the provinces, Watson stated: "the Lieutenant Governor... is as much a representative of Her Majesty, for all purposes of Provincial Government as the Governor General himself is, for all purposes of Dominion Government." As well, the Judicial Committee found in 1932 that there was a definite separation between the provincial and federal treasuries; "It is true there is only one Crown, but as regards Crown revenues and Crown property by legislation assented to by the Crown there is a distinction to be made between the property in the Province and the revenues and property in the Dominion. There are two purses." The Lord Denning of the Court of Appeal of England and Wales ruled in 1982 that "the Crown became separate and divisible, according to the particular territory in which it was sovereign... It was separate and divisible for each self-governing Dominion or province or territory."

The Crown became the foundation of "the federative principle in Canada." The lieutenant governors' equal status to the governor general is crucial to provincial co-sovereignty and federalism, the monarchy having been said to provide flexibility to the Canadian federation and thus be a factor in its sustainability. Indeed, provincial premiers have used the monarchy to the advantage of their respective provinces, recognising that "the Crown has been the engine or propeller of expanded provincial constitutional authority in the shifting balance of power within the Canadian confederation." David Smith opined that, by being separated from the monarch by two levels of viceregal representation, the Canadian populace has been made more accepting of the Crown's role in determining who will govern in a minority parliament situation, while Canadian republican leader Tom Freda opposes the system, calling the lieutenant governors "redundant and obsolete", as does Parti Québécois leader Pauline Marois, who opined that the Lieutenant Governor of Quebec is a "waste of money".

Today, though they continue to be appointed and dismissed by the governor general and only the federal parliament may initiate constitutional changes to their role, the lieutenant governors are now considered to be direct representatives of the sovereign, which has accorded them the right to receive audience with the monarch; a practice begun by the Lieutenant Governor of Alberta in 1956. They are also still only accorded the style of His/Her Honour, which is inferior to the governor General's style of His/Her Excellency, and may receive only a 15-gun salute, as opposed to the 21-gun salute given to the federal viceroy. The relationship between all the governments has been facilitated since 1970 by triennial meetings of the eleven viceroys (and now the three territorial commissioners as well), hosted each time by a different lieutenant governor in their province, though the chairperson is always the governor general.

Finances
Funding of the Crown's operation in the provinces is split between the federal and provincial governments. As the viceroy is a federal appointee, the federal Crown pays in two parts—In Capital City Expenses and Out of Capital City Expenses—for some of the lieutenant governors' costs of office; his or her salary, which, like the governor general's, is fully taxed; and, through the Department of Canadian Heritage, a superannuation to retired lieutenant governors, though this money is actually garnished off of the individual's salary during his or her time in office. The provincial coffers supply the relevant lieutenant governor for other expenses of office, travel costs, and the upkeep of official residences, amongst other necessities. There is no uniform way in which each province distributes the money, and the amounts will also vary, depending on the facilities available to the monarch's representative, how they are used, which departments support them, and how they expenditures are listed in the provincial estimates.

The sovereign and other members of the Royal Family are only supported by tax dollars in the performance of their official duties. Should a province be hosting events that involve royal participation, the costs are also split between the federal and provincial spheres—the provincial Crown may pay for accommodation and transport, while the federal Crown supplies funds for Royal Canadian Mounted Police security and other household staff. Residents of the provinces do not pay any money to the royals, either as personal income or to support royal residences outside of the province.

Personification of the state
The sovereign is regarded as the personification, or legal personality, of each of the provincial states, with the state therefore referred to as The Crown in Right of [Province], His Majesty in Right of [Province], or The King in Right of [Province]. As such, the monarch is the employer of all provincial government staff (including the viceroys, judges, police officers, and members of the legislative assemblies), the guardian of foster children (Crown wards), as well as the owner of all state lands (Crown land), buildings and equipment (Crown-held property), state-owned companies (Crown Corporations), and the copyright for all government publications (Crown copyright). This is all in his position as sovereign, and not as an individual; all such property is inherited by each successive sovereign as possession of the Crown in right of the province in perpetuity and it cannot be sold by the sovereign without the lieutenant governor doing so with the proper advice and consent of their ministers.

As the embodiment of the state, the monarch is at the head of all provincial orders of precedence, and is also the locus of the Oath of Allegiance, which is constitutionally required of members of the legislative assemblies and of the recruits of some provincial police forces, per statute law. This is done in reciprocation to the sovereign's Coronation Oath, wherein he or she promises "to govern the Peoples of... Canada... according to their respective laws and customs." There was in the 1970s some opposition to the oath by Parti Québécois members of the National Assembly of Quebec, where an additional oath to the people of Quebec has been added.

Constitutional role

The operation of the Crown in the Canadian provinces is very similar to its function in the federal jurisdiction, wherein the role of the monarch is both legal and practical, and the Crown is regarded as a corporation, with the sovereign, vested as he is with all powers of state, as the centre of a constitutional construct in which several parts—the institutions of government acting under the sovereign's authority—share the power of the whole. Unlike with the federal Crown, the monarch personally has little direct involvement with the provinces, the exercise of the Royal Prerogative delegated entirely to the lieutenant governors, who are appointed by the governor general on the advice of the prime minister of Canada, though usually in consultation with the relevant provincial premier, and the monarch is informed of the prime minister's decision before the governor general gives the viceroyal sign-manual and affixes the Great Seal of Canada to the commission. The sovereign may still hold audience with the provincial premiers.

Executive
A provincial government is defined by the Constitution Act, 1867, as the lieutenant governor acting on the advice of the executive council, what is technically known as the Lieutenant-Governor-in-Council, referring to the lieutenant governor as the King's stand-in. One of the main duties of the Crown in a province is to appoint the individual most likely to maintain the confidence of the legislative assembly as premier; this is usually the leader of the political party with a majority in the legislature, but when no party or coalition holds a majority (referred to as a minority parliament), or similar scenario, the lieutenant governor's judgement about the most suitable candidate for premier must be brought into play. The premier thereafter heads the executive council, which is made up of other ministers of the Crown who are similarly drawn from and responsible to the elected legislature and are charged with advising the lieutenant governor on how to exercise the royal prerogative, which includes the privilege to maintain the King's peace, grant immunity from prosecution, and invoke the prerogative of mercy, as well as to summon and prorogue parliament and call elections. In the construct of constitutional monarchy and responsible government, the ministerial advice tendered is typically binding; the monarch reigns but does not rule. Though it may often appear differently, the royal prerogative belongs to the Crown, not to any of the ministers, and the viceroyal figures may unilaterally use these powers in exceptional constitutional crisis situations. On five occasions a lieutenant governor has dismissed a cabinet due to a crisis of confidence in the incumbent government: in Quebec in 1878 and 1891 and in British Columbia in 1898, 1900, and 1901. The Lieutenant Governor of British Columbia, Judith Guichon, in 2017 refused the advice of her premier to dissolve parliament and instead called on the leader of the opposition to form a government.

Members of various executive agencies and other officials—such as the attorney general, the secretary and registrar of the province, the treasurer, the commissioner of Crown lands, and the commissioner of agriculture and public works—are appointed by the Crown under the great seal of the province. Further, only in Nova Scotia and New Brunswick may the lieutenant governor appoint judges of the courts of probate, and only in Quebec is the solicitor general commissioned by the viceroy. Public inquiries are also commissioned by the monarch or governor-in-council through a royal warrant, and are called royal commissions.

Parliament
The lieutenant governor and the legislature are the two components of the parliament in each of the provinces, the former's authority therein being embodied in each house's mace, which all bear a crown at their apex. Also, the enacting formula in most provinces (British Columbia, Alberta, Saskatchewan, Manitoba, and New Brunswick) reads as: "Therefore, His Majesty, by and with the advice and consent of the Legislative Assembly of [Province], enacts as follows..." The viceroy, who may alone summon, prorogue, and dissolve the legislative assembly, drop the writs for a general election, and read the Speech From the Throne, does not participate in the legislative process, save for the granting of Royal Assent, which is required to make into law a bill passed by the legislature. The lieutenant governor may deny Royal Assent or reserve a bill for the governor general's decision, though the federal viceroy may further defer the bill to the monarch, who can disallow the bill within a time limit specified by the constitution. A bill has not been reserved for the governor general's consideration since 1961; Royal Assent has not been denied since the Lieutenant Governor of Prince Edward Island did so in 1935.

The monarch's direct participation in the provincial legislatures is unclear. In 1939, King George VI held audience with his subjects in the Legislative Council Chamber of Quebec's parliament, but did not preside there as sovereign in the legislature; in a manner similar to how his daughter, Queen Elizabeth II, addressed the same legislature in 1964 and the Legislative Assembly of Alberta in 2005. In 1959, Premier of British Columbia W. A. C. Bennett wished to have Elizabeth II read the Speech From the Throne at the opening of the parliamentary session, but his request was turned down on the grounds that it was unconstitutional for the Queen to do so. Premier of Alberta Ralph Klein desired in 2005 to have the Queen grant Royal Assent to bills passed by Legislative Assembly of Alberta; this time, the proposal was rejected by the Secretary to the Governor General, Barbra Uteck, as being counter to the "Canadianization" of the Crown. Though united in their shock at the republican tone in this response from the federal viceroy's office, monarchists debated the legal legitimacy of denying the Queen the ability to give her assent to provincial bills.

Courts
The sovereign is responsible for rendering justice for all his subjects, and is thus traditionally deemed the fount of justice. Neither he nor his viceroys personally rule in judicial cases; instead the judicial functions of the Royal Prerogative are performed in trust and in the King's name by officers of His Majesty's court, as is done in the federal jurisdiction. As the judges and courts are the sovereign's judges and courts, and as all law in Canada derives from the Crown, the monarch stands to give legitimacy to courts of justice and is the source of their judicial authority. An image of the King and/or his relevant provincial coat of arms is always displayed in provincial courtrooms, except in British Columbia and Newfoundland and Labrador, where the sovereign's arms for the United Kingdom are displayed. Itinerant judges will display an image of the King and the provincial flag when holding a session away from established courtrooms; such situations occur in parts of Canada where the stakeholders in a given court case are too isolated geographically to be able to travel for regular proceedings. Further, the superior courts of Alberta, Saskatchewan, Manitoba, and New Brunswick are called His Majesty's Court of King's Bench of [Province] (summarised as King's Bench), and the law in British Columbia, Newfoundland and Labrador, and Saskatchewan allows for the lieutenant governor to appoint prominent lawyers as King's Counsel, a predominantly honorary title recognising exceptional merit and contribution to the legal profession. The Manitoba government of New Democratic Party leader Gary Doer changed in 2001 the designation of King's Counsel to Senior Counsel, doing so against the opinion of the Benchers of the Law Society of Manitoba.

Cultural role

Royal presence and duties

Either as the host or a guest of honour, the monarch, other members of the Canadian royal family, and/or the lieutenant governor attend throughout the year numerous provincial functions that fall into one of two categories:{{#tag:ref|In 2004, the provincial viceroys participated in over 3,500 engagements.<ref>{{cite web | last1=Guthrie| first1=Gavin |last2=Aimers |first2=John |author-link2=John Aimers |title=$1.54 per Canadian: The cost of Canada's constitutional monarchy, 2005 |url=http://www.monarchist.ca/new/docs/Report.pdf| access-date=30 December 2016 |edition=3rd |year=2006 |publisher=Monarchist League of Canada| location=Toronto| page=10| archive-url=https://web.archive.org/web/20100806123147/http://www.monarchist.ca/new/docs/Report.pdf| archive-date=6 August 2010}}</ref>|group=n|name=Viceroys}} official visits—which take place at the direction of the relevant provincial government, through the federal Department of Canadian Heritage, and include such events as centennials and bicentennials, the openings of fairs or races, anniversaries of First Nations treaty signings, awards ceremonies, commemorations, anniversaries of the monarch's accession, and the like—or working visits—which focus on organizations such as charities or military regiments, and the invitation and expenses associated with these undertakings are predominantly borne by the associated organization. Usually important milestones, anniversaries, or celebrations of Canadian culture will warrant the presence of the monarch, while other royals will be asked to participate in lesser occasions. Also, shorter, province-specific tours organized by the relevant provincial government have become more popular into the 21st century.

Throughout the provinces, there can thus be found plaques, cornerstones, and trees documenting official royal visits to the area. Gifts are also sometimes offered from the people of a province to the royal person to mark a visit or an important milestone.

It is also part of the lieutenant governors' duties (apart from the Lieutenant Governor of Quebec) to bestow provincial honours upon deserving citizens. Only twice, so far, has a member of the Royal Family awarded in person a provincial honour: in 2004, Anne, Princess Royal, presented in Saskatoon the Saskatchewan Protective Services Medal to 25 recipients and, on 6 July 2010, Queen Elizabeth II presented the Ontario Medal for Good Citizenship to four recipients.

Symbols, associations, and awards

The main symbol of the monarchy is the sovereign himself and his image is thus used to signify government authority—his portrait, for instance, appearing in government buildings. A royal cypher or crown is also used to illustrate the monarchy as the locus of authority without referring to any specific monarch. The former appears on buildings and official seals and the latter on provincial coats of arms, as well as police force badges and rank insignia. The sovereign is also both mentioned in and the subject of songs, loyal toasts, and salutes.

The monarch is the fount of all honours in the Canadian provinces, the first being the Order of the Dogwood for the British Columbia's centennial in 1957. Unlike in the federal sphere, where new orders, decorations, and medals may only be created with the approval of the sovereign through letters patent, the same in the provinces are formed through Order in Council by the relevant lieutenant governor in the monarch's name. Hence, the insignia and medallions for these awards bear a crown, cypher, and/or effigy of the monarch.

In 2022, the federal government opted not to produce a platinum jubilee medal, despite having issued medals for previous royal jubilees of Canadian monarchs. In response, six provincesAlberta, Manitoba, New Brunswick, Nova Scotia, Prince Edward Island, and Saskatchewaninstituted a provincial platinum jubilee medal program to mark the Queen's seventy years on the Canadian throne.

Besides government and military institutions, a number of Canadian civilian organizations have association with the monarchy, either through their being founded via a Royal Charter (such as the Royal Winnipeg Ballet, the city of Saint John, New Brunswick, the Royal Kennebecasis Yacht Club, and McGill University), having been granted the right to use the prefix royal before their name (such as the Royal Quebec Golf Club and Royal Manitoba Winter Fair), or because at least one member of the Royal Family serves as a patron. Some of these organizations may use a royal crown in their logo or coat of arms, though this is a gift from the monarch showing royal support and/or association, and requires his approval before being added.

Viceregal Badge of Service

Queen Elizabeth II in 1999 approved the design and issuance of the Viceregal Badge of Service, which features a diamond shape framing a red circle bearing a maple leaf; the lieutenant governors' badge is gold in appearance and the one for their spouse is silver. On 1 January 2000, all living current and former lieutenant governors and their spouses were presented with the badge.

See also
 Monarchy in Newfoundland and Labrador
 Monarchy in Prince Edward Island
 Monarchy in Nova Scotia
 Monarchy in New Brunswick
 Monarchy in Quebec
 Monarchy in Ontario
 Monarchy in Manitoba
 Monarchy in Saskatchewan
 Monarchy in Alberta
 Monarchy in British Columbia
 List of current Canadian lieutenant governors and commissioners

Notes

References

 

Further information

Reading
 
 
 
 MacKinnon, Frank (1976). The Crown in Canada''. Calgary, Alta.: Glenbow-Alberta Institute: McClelland and Stewart West. 189 p.  pbk

Viewing
 

Provinces, monarchy in
Government in Canada